Inger Lise Hegge (born 6 January 1965) is a Norwegian cross-country skier who competed from 1989 to 1995. Her best World Cup finish was fourth in a 30 km event in the Soviet Union in 1991.

At the 1992 Winter Olympics in Albertville, Hegge finished 14th in the 30 km and 21st in the 15 km events. Her best finish at the FIS Nordic World Ski Championships was 11th in the 30 km event at Falun in 1993.

She represented the club Henning SL.

Cross-country skiing results
All results are sourced from the International Ski Federation (FIS).

Olympic Games

World Championships

World Cup

Season standings

Team podiums

 2 podiums

References

External links

1965 births
Cross-country skiers at the 1992 Winter Olympics
Living people
People from Steinkjer
Norwegian female cross-country skiers
Olympic cross-country skiers of Norway
Sportspeople from Trøndelag
20th-century Norwegian women